

The Bolivian bamboo rat (Dactylomys boliviensis), is a species of spiny rat from South America.

Description
It is also unusual in having a hairless tail, soft (rather than spiny) fur, and only four visible toes on the fore-feet.

Most of the body is covered in soft grizzled greyish hair, and marked with blackish streaks. A darker line runs down the centre of the back, while the underparts have only sparse, white fur. The long tail is hairless, except at the base, and covered with large, pentagonal scales. The fifth toe on the forefeet is vestigial, consisting only of a tiny claw located on a tubercle at the side of the foot. The third and fourth toes are widely separated, giving the rat a grasp that has been likened to that of primates. The head has a distinctive blunt nose, and long whiskers. There is also a strong-smelling scent gland just above the sternum.

Distribution and habitat
Bolivian bamboo rats are found in central Bolivia, southeastern Peru, and extreme western Brazil. However, within this range, they are found only in specific habitats, inhabiting dense bamboo thickets below  altitude, or along densely vegetated riverbanks.

Biology and behaviour
Bolivian bamboo rats feed on bamboo, stripping away the outer bark to gnaw at the stems. Population densities can be high, and one individual studied had a home range of just . The rats are agile climbers, and move through heavy vegetation almost silently. When disturbed, the freeze in place, or run swiftly up into trees.

Moving only at night, and then slowly and in areas of dense vegetation, Bolivian bamboo rats can be difficult to observe. However, they do make distinctive calls, which may carry over long distances, and are apparently used to communicate with one another. These calls consist of a series of short, staccato grunts, and have compared to those of toads. The calls are often made while the rats are perched on branches, or after scent marking with their sternal glands. Other nearby individuals often respond with calls of their own.

References

Dactylomys
Mammals described in 1920